Robert James Forrest (born 25 May 1993) is an Irish cricketer. He made his Twenty20 cricket debut for Munster Reds in the 2017 Inter-Provincial Trophy on 26 May 2017.

References

External links
 

1993 births
Living people
Irish cricketers
Munster Reds cricketers
Place of birth missing (living people)